Thanasi Kokkinakis and Nick Kyrgios defeated Jason Kubler and John Peers in the final, 7–6(7–4), 7–5 to win the doubles tennis title at the 2022 Atlanta Open.

Reilly Opelka and Jannik Sinner were the reigning champions, but did not participate this year.

Rajeev Ram would have taken over the ATP no. 1 doubles ranking from his regular partner Joe Salisbury by winning the title partnering Jack Sock, but lost to Kokkinakis and Kyrgios in the semifinals.

Seeds

Draw

Draw

References

External links
 Main draw

Atlanta Open - Doubles
2022 Doubles